Westwood Mosque (also known as Oldham Muslim Centre) is a mosque located in Oldham, Greater Manchester, United Kingdom. Plans to establish the centre began in 1990, when property was acquired on Chadderton Way, before moving to the Compass House in 2010.

History

Chadderton Way (1990-2010)

Compass House (2010-Present)

Purpose-built Mosque

See also 

 East London Mosque
 Islamic Forum of Europe
 Islam in the United Kingdom
 British Bangladeshis
 Islamic schools and branches

References

External links 

  

Mosques in England
Mosques in the United Kingdom
Buildings and structures in Oldham